John Cotterell was an English clergyman and academic.

John Cotterell may also refer to:

John Coterell (fl. 1390–1421), MP for Wallingford
Sir John Cotterell, 1st Baronet (1757–1845), MP for Herefordshire
Sir John Henry Cotterell, 2nd Baronet (1830–1847), of the Cotterell baronets
Sir John Cotterell, 4th Baronet (1866–1937), of the Cotterell baronets, Lord Lieutenant of Herefordshire
Sir John Henry Geers Cotterell, 6th Baronet (born 1935), of the Cotterell baronets

See also
Cotterell (disambiguation)